Bodfach is a hamlet in the community of Llanfyllin, Powys, Wales, which is 89 miles (144 km) from Cardiff and 160 miles (257 km) from London.

Nearby Bodfach Estate goes back to 1160 when by Einion Efell inherited the land from his father Madog ap Maredudd, Prince of Powys, following the destruction of the Tomen yr Allt motte and bailey castle which stood on the hill above Bodfach. The Woodland Trust, in partnership with the owners, have planted many new trees as part of a project to restore the character of this ancient royal landscape.

The 'Llanfyllin Show' is held at Bodfach, and the 142nd show took place in 2013.

See also 
 List of localities in Wales by population

References 

Villages in Powys
Llanfyllin